Hampstead Barracks is an Australian Army base in the Adelaide suburb of Greenacres, located about  to the north of the Adelaide central business district. Situated on the corner of Hampstead and Muller Roads, it is only a small suburban base, sitting on less than 24 acres of land. The barracks is home to the Tom Derrick VC Soldiers' Club, which is named after Tom Derrick, a South Australian Victoria Cross recipient from the Second World War.

The Adelaide Universities Regiment (AUR), an Australian Army Reserve officer training unit, is the main occupying unit, with the base hosting the Regimental Headquarters, as well as Training, Support and Beersheba Companies. The regiment's commanding officer is also the garrison commander. Other units located at Hampstead have included the Land Warfare Centre – South Australia (LWC–SA), which consists of the Warrant Officer and Non Commissioned Officer Academy South Australian Wing (WO & NCO A-SA Wing) and the Regional Education Detachment – South Australia, both of which are units of the Regular Army, although both have since moved to RAAF Edinburgh. The base is also home to a number of cadet units. These include: 4 Flight, No. 604 Squadron, Australian Air Force Cadets, and 'A' Company, 44 Army Cadet Unit and Headquarters South Australia Australian Army Cadets Brigade (HQ SA AAC Bde).

In 2007, there was a proposal to close the base as part of the rationalisation of Army bases in Adelaide which would have seen the personnel based at Hampstead relocated to RAAF Base Edinburgh and Warradale Barracks. As of 2011, however, the base remains open.

References 

Barracks in Australia
Buildings and structures in Adelaide
Military installations in South Australia